Expedition is a national park in Queensland, Australia, 490 km northwest of Brisbane. It is named for the Expedition Range of mountains.

The park is part of the Brigalow Belt bioregion. This area is mostly dominated by dry eucalyptus forests.

Robinson Gorge was the first section to be declared a national park in 1951.

Wildlife 
145 species of animals have been recorded in the park, 2 of which are on the list of endangered or rare species and 283 species of plants, of which 2 also belong to rare or endangered species.

See also

 Protected areas of Queensland

References

National parks of Central Queensland
Protected areas established in 1991
1991 establishments in Australia